Matthew Elliott (born 8 December 1964) is an Australian professional rugby league football coach, commentator and former player. He has previously coached in the NRL with the Canberra Raiders, Penrith Panthers and the New Zealand Warriors, as well the Bradford Bulls in the Super League and the United States national team. Elliott is currently the Assistant Coach at the St. George Illawarra Dragons.

Playing career
Born on Thursday Island, Elliott grew up in Townsville in far north Queensland.

Elliott played for Bondi United and was an Eastern Suburbs Roosters lower grade player.

He played two seasons with French club, Le Pontet, winning the league and cup double in 1987-88.

Between 1989 and 1992 Elliott played 61 games for the St. George Dragons. At the end of the 1992 NSWRL season Elliott played for the Dragons off the bench in their grand final loss against the Brisbane Broncos.

Coaching career
Injury cut Elliotts playing career short and he became an assistant to Brian Smith at the Dragons.

Bradford Bulls
Elliott followed Smith to the Bradford Bulls in 1996, before taking over as head coach. Elliott won the Super League title in his first season. In 1997 and 1999 he was named the Super League coach of the Year. He coached the Bradford Bulls to the 1999 Super League Grand Final which was lost to St. Helens.

Canberra
After serving as assistant to Canberra Raiders coach Mal Meninga during the 2001 NRL season, Elliott was made coach for the 2002 premiership. During his tenure at the Raiders, Canberra won 59 and drew one of their 125 games, including four finals appearances in five seasons.

Elliott's most successful coaching season was 2003, when the Raiders won 16 of 24 games but were eliminated from the finals without winning a game.

Penrith
On 19 February 2006, it was announced that Elliott would coach the Penrith Panthers from 2007 onwards, having signed a three-year deal. Elliott succeeded John Lang in this position.

In September 2008, Elliott was criticized for Penrith's consistent poor showings and it was speculated that he would be prematurely sacked before he saw through his three-year contract with the club. Elliott however defied the pressure and criticism and managed to convince the board into letting him remain in charge for the 2009 season.

After a promising start to the 2009 season, Elliott's contract was extended to the end of the 2011 season. In the 2010 season, the Panthers finished second in the ladder, but they did not win a match in the finals series. Their 645 was the most points scored in the regular season, the second highest being 559.

On 25 April 2011, Elliott was informed by the Penrith board that his services would not be required beyond 2011. He vowed to continue at the helm for the rest of the season at the time, then on 20 June announced his resignation with immediate effect.

He is the current coach of the United States national side. Following the 2011 NRL season Elliott coached the United States national rugby league team to a 40-4 victory over Jamaica to qualify for the 2013 Rugby League World Cup, their first ever.

Matthew has served as head-coach of USA Tomahawks on three separate occasions, recording a 40-4 win against South Africa in 2001, a 40-4 win v Jamaica in 2011 and just one narrow 16-18 defeat to Canada on 18 Sep 2011.

Sydney Roosters
In 2012 Elliott served as Sydney Roosters assistant coach, again working under Brian Smith.

New Zealand Warriors
On 12 October 2012 Elliott was appointed head coach of the New Zealand Warriors for two seasons, replacing Brian McClennan who was sacked during the 2012 New Zealand Warriors season. He resigned as the USA coach before the 2013 Rugby League World Cup, to concentrate on the Warriors' off season. On 7 April 2014, he was sacked from the Warriors.

St. George Illawarra Dragons 
On September 28, 2020, it was announced that Elliott would be an Assistant coach to new Dragons Head Coach Anthony Griffin commencing in 2021.

Commentary career
From 2015 Elliott has been part of the ABC Radio Grandstand commentary team.

References 

1964 births
Living people
Australian expatriate sportspeople in England
Australian rugby league players
St. George Dragons players
Australian rugby league coaches
Australian rugby league commentators
Canberra Raiders coaches
Bradford Bulls coaches
Penrith Panthers coaches
New Zealand Warriors coaches
Rugby league second-rows
Rugby league players from Thursday Island
United States national rugby league team coaches